Stylephorus chordatus, the tube-eye or thread-tail, is a deep-sea fish, the only fish in the genus Stylephorus and family Stylephoridae.

It is found in deep subtropical and tropical waters around the world, living at depths during the day and making nightly vertical migrations to feed on plankton. Its eyes are tubular in shape, resembling a pair of binoculars.

It has a tubular mouth through which it sucks seawater by enlarging its oral cavity to about 40 times its original size. It then expels the water through the gills, leaving behind the copepods on which it feeds.

The phylogenetic position of the tube-eye has been controversial. It has been historically placed amongst Lampriformes, but a study involving mitochondrial and nuclear DNA sequences analysis suggested Stylephorus is instead a close parent of the Gadiformes order (cods and hakes).

References

Stylephoridae
Monotypic fish genera
Fish described in 1791